Jeremy William Fredric Smith (born 18 June 1990), known professionally as Jeremy Irvine, is an English actor who made his film debut in the epic war film War Horse (2011). In 2012, he portrayed Philip "Pip" Pirrip in the film adaptation of Great Expectations.

He has since starred in The Woman in Black: Angel of Death (2015), and portrayed Daniel Grigori in the direct-to-video film adaptation of the young adult novel Fallen (2016), as well as young Sam in Mamma Mia! Here We Go Again (2018). In 2019, he starred as John Randolph Bentley in the USA Network television series Treadstone.

Early life
Irvine was born Jeremy William Fredric Smith on 18 June 1990 in Gamlingay, Cambridgeshire, where he was raised. His mother, Bridget Smith, is a Liberal Democrat councillor on (and latterly leader of) the South Cambridgeshire District Council, and his father, Chris Smith, is an engineer.

He has two younger brothers, one of whom portrayed a younger version of Irvine's Pip in Great Expectations. All three boys have diabetes. Irvine's stage surname was his grandfather's first name. His great-grandfather, Sir Ralph Lilley Turner, wrote the quotation used as the inscription on London's Gurkha Memorial.

Irvine started acting at age 16. He says his drama teacher inspired him to pursue acting: "I never fitted in, which led me to acting. I was looking for something different." He played Romeo along with other main roles in plays whilst attending Bedford Modern School, followed by a run with the National Youth Theatre.

After completing a one-year foundation course at the London Academy of Music and Dramatic Art (LAMDA), which he attended with Sam Claflin, Irvine spent two years posting his CV through letterboxes in an effort to get acting work. He almost gave up acting for good just before he got his big break in War Horse. In an interview with CBS News while promoting Great Expectations, he described this as the lowest point of his life and revealed that he considered taking a different career path: "I'd kind of hit rock bottom and really did think this was stupid and I just wasted three or four years of my life. My dad wanted me to get a job being a welder. At the company he was at, he was an engineer. I was very very close to doing that."

Career

Irvine worked in his local supermarket and also did web design prior to gaining success as an actor.  He played Luke in the television series Life Bites and appeared in the Royal Shakespeare Company's 2010 production of Dunsinane. He was quoted in Interview Magazine, saying: "My friends all took the mick out of me for Dunsinane saying, 'You're gonna be the tree'. Indeed, in my first scene, I was waving two branches."

In June 2010, he was cast in the lead role of the 2011 Steven Spielberg film War Horse. The film was an adaption of Michael Morpurgo's novel, also entitled War Horse. Spielberg revealed that he had been looking for an unknown actor for War Horse, stating: "I looked at hundreds of actors and newcomers for Albert – mainly newcomers – and nobody had the heart, the spirit or the communication skills that Jeremy had." Irvine was asked to read a section of the War Horse script on camera in order to check his West Country accent. In an attempt to prepare himself for the role of Albert, Irvine took up weight training and gained approximately 14 pounds of muscle. He also underwent two months of intensive horse riding. He spent so much time recreating the Battle of Somme scene in the film that he ended up contracting trench foot. For his work in the film, he was nominated for the London Film Critics' Choice Award for Young British Performer Of The Year and Empire Award for Best Male Newcomer.

In April 2011, Variety reported that Irvine had been cast as Pip in a 2012 film adaptation of Great Expectations by Charles Dickens. In October 2011, The Hollywood Reporter announced that he was set to play the young Eric Lomax in the film production of The Railway Man. He then starred in the independent film Now Is Good, alongside Dakota Fanning. In February 2013 Variety stated that he had been cast in a film based on the novel The World Made Straight. Also in 2013, he was cast as Daniel Grigori in the film Fallen, based on the young adult series of the same name.

On 12 August 2014, Deadline reported that Irvine had been cast as Percy Bysshe Shelley in Mary Shelley's Monster. The film has been described as "a story of youth that transcends time, a gothic romance, a love triangle that involves a dark passenger." In November 2015, he starred in Don Broco's music video for the song "Nerve". Irvine attended the same school, Bedford Modern, as the band's members. The following month, Irvine joined the cast of the feature film remake of Billionaire Boys Club.

In 2018, Irvine portrayed the younger version of Sam Carmichael (Pierce Brosnan) in the sequel to Mamma Mia!, Mamma Mia! Here We Go Again. In July 2017, Irvine confirmed via his Instagram that he had joined the cast of The Last Full Measure alongside Tommy Hatto and Zach Roerig.

In 2019, he starred as John Randolph Bentley in the USA Network television series Treadstone.

Personal life
Irvine has had diabetes mellitus type 1 since childhood: "When I was six, I was diagnosed with type 1 diabetes. I was on four injections a day, which I administered myself." His two brothers also suffer from diabetes. Irvine has been involved in trials with the Juvenile Diabetes Research Foundation (JDRF) to test an artificial pancreas, a form of automatic glucose meter attached to a portable insulin pump. The tests took place at Addenbrooke's Hospital with the University of Cambridge during 2005 and 2007. Irvine introduced his experiences with diabetes to Camilla, Duchess of Cornwall during a visit to the Cambridge Welcome Trust Clinical Research Facility on 7 February 2012. He was again present with the Duchess on 31 January 2013 at University College London Hospitals NHS Foundation Trust's inpatient adolescent ward, after she had become president of the JDRF in 2012.

Irvine avoids the spotlight and tries to maintain privacy, once saying that "I realised very quickly that I didn't want to be famous, so I don't go to Mahiki, I just go down the pub with all my mates". When asked about his rising fame, he said, "When War Horse came out, I had maybe a month of people stopping me in the street, then it died down. I try to ignore all that and pretend none of it exists. We're only acting. The work my mum does, a lot of it is re-housing homeless people, that's a real job. I play make-believe and dressing up for a living!" He currently lives in West Hampstead, London.

Filmography

Film

Television

Theatre

Music videos

References

External links

 
 
 

1990 births
21st-century English male actors
Alumni of the London Academy of Music and Dramatic Art
English male film actors
English male stage actors
English male television actors
Living people
Male actors from Cambridgeshire
National Youth Theatre members
People educated at Bedford Modern School
People from South Cambridgeshire District
People with type 1 diabetes
Royal Shakespeare Company members
Chopard Trophy for Male Revelation winners